This is a list of the divers who will be participating for their country at the 2016 Summer Olympics in Rio de Janeiro, Brazil from  August 5–21, 2016. 136 divers are set to participate at the Games across four events.

Male divers

Female divers

References

http://www.fina.org/athletes

List
Lists of acrobatic divers
Divers